The Four Seasons Hotel Damascus is a 297-room five-star hotel and was part of the Toronto-based Four Seasons luxury hotels and resorts from 2005 to June 19, 2019. It is located in the central district neighborhood of Damascus, Syria, near the Barada River, on Shukri Al Quatli Street.

History
The hotel was financed by Saudi prince Al-Waleed bin Talal and was constructed by the local Fouad Takla Company. It opened on December 1, 2005. Al-Waleed later sold his stake in the hotel to Syrian businessman Samer Foz. The Syrian government is the second largest stakeholder in the hotel. Four Seasons Hotels severed its management contract with the property effective June 19, 2019, due to US sanctions on Foz. The US government accused Foz of war-profiteering and doing business with the Syrian President, Bashar al-Assad. In 2021, the United Nations spent $11.5 million at the hotel. As of 2022, the hotel continues to operate using the Four Seasons name and logo, though it is no longer recognized as part of the chain.

Gallery

References

External links

 Four Seasons Hotel Damascus official Facebook page

2005 establishments in Syria
Hotels in Damascus
Hotels established in 2005
Hotel buildings completed in 2005